"Workin' Man (Nowhere to Go)" is a song written by Jimmie Fadden, and recorded by American country music group Nitty Gritty Dirt Band. The song was released in April 1988 as the lead single from the album Workin' Band.  The song reached number 4 on the Billboard Hot Country Singles & Tracks chart.

Charts

Weekly charts

Year-end charts

References

1988 singles
1988 songs
Nitty Gritty Dirt Band songs
Song recordings produced by Josh Leo
Warner Records singles